Calocidaris micans is a species of sea urchins of the family Cidaridae. Their armour is covered with spines. Calocidaris micans was first scientifically described in 1903 by Ole Mortensen.

References 

Animals described in 1903
Cidaridae
Taxa named by Ole Theodor Jensen Mortensen